Do Boond Pani (meaning: Two Drops of Water) is a 1971 Hindi social drama film produced and directed by Khwaja Ahmad Abbas. Made under the "Naya Sansar" banner; the story, screenplay and dialogues were by K. A. Abbas, with additional dialogues by Inder Raj Anand. The music was composed by Jaidev. The cast included Simi Garewal, Jalal Agha and Madhu Chanda and was the debut film of actor Kiran Kumar. The film won the award for Best Feature film on National integration.

Set against the backdrop of Rajasthan, the film focused on the scarcity of water, and the eventual building of a dam.  Ganga Singh (Jalal Agha) goes to work on the dam, but loses his life, leaving behind his widow and a young son in the village. His sacrifice helps transform the desert land into a fertile area with the dam being called Ganga Sagar dam.

Plot
Ganga Singh (Jalal Agha), newly married to Gauri (Simi Garewal), brings his wife to his village, in Rajsthan where he lives with his father Hari Singh (Sajjan), and sister Sonki (Madhu Chanda). They live hand to mouth in this poor village which is suffering from drought and villagers have to travel a long distance to get water. Ganga Singh hears of a dam being constructed and leaves his wife to join in the building of it. His family goes through misfortunes, with his father dying and his sister being raped by the dacoit Mangal Singh. Ganga himself dies preventing a disaster at the dam. The dam is eventually built bringing greenery to an arid region. His wife bears a son and lives on in the village.

Cast
 Jalal Agha as Ganga Singh
 Simi Garewal as Gauri
 Madhu Chanda as Sonki
 Sajjan as Hari Singh
 Prakash Thapa as Mangal Singh
 Kiran Kumar as Mohan Kaul 
 Rashid Khan as Bhikhu 
 Pinchoo Kapoor as Postman

Reception
The film was referred to as an "inspirational melodrama" and the music by Jaidev was stated as a "magisterial score", however, the film was not a commercial success and flopped at the box office.

Awards
 Nargis Dutt Award for Best Feature Film on National Integration.

Soundtrack
Composer Jaidev got Asha Bhosle to sing for Do Boond Pani, for the song "Ja Ri Pawaniya". The lyricists were  Kaifi Azmi, Balkavi Bairagi and M. R. Mukul. The playback singing was provided by Asha Bhosle, Lakshmi Shankar, Parveen Sultana, Meenu Purushottam, Mukesh, Ambar Kumar, Shrikant Moghe and Bhushan Mehta.

Song list

References

External links
 

1971 films
1970s Hindi-language films
1971 drama films
Films directed by K. A. Abbas
Films scored by Jaidev
Best Film on National Integration National Film Award winners
Indian drama films